Clayton James Cosgrove (born 31 October 1969) is a former New Zealand politician. He is a member of the Labour Party.

Early life

Cosgrove was born in Nelson, New Zealand. He received a BA (Triple Major), in History, American Studies and Political Science, from the University of Canterbury in 1992 and received an MBA in 1996. Before entering politics, he worked in the Corporate Affair field within the Minerals and Telecommunications industries. He was also a small business owner.

Labour Party involvement

Cosgove has been a member of the Labour Party since he was fourteen, and has held a number of posts within the party. He was chairman of the party's Canterbury branch from 1989 to 1994.

He was a strong supporter of Moore, and opposed Moore's replacement by Helen Clark. Before the 1996 election he was involved in discussions with Moore to form a new party but this failed to eventuate.

Member of Parliament

Cosgrove himself stood for election in Moore's former Waimakariri seat in the 1999 election, and was successful. During 2002 he was selected and graduated the World Economic Forum's Global Leaders of Tomorrow programme (later called Young Global Leaders). He was re-elected in the 2002, 2005 and 2008 general elections. However, he was defeated in the electorate by National's Kate Wilkinson in 2011 and was subsequently elected as list MP. Doocey beat Cosgrove with an increased majority. Being again in eighth place on the Labour list, Cosgrove remained a list MP.

Cabinet minister (2005–2008)
He was appointed Minister for Building and Construction, Minister of Statistics, Associate Minister of Finance, Associate Minister of Justice and Associate Minister of Immigration (responsible for individual immigration cases) after the 2005 election. At the October 2007 Cabinet reshuffle, he was promoted and replaced his Building and Construction and Statistics portfolio responsibilities; with the Immigration, Small Business, Sport and Recreation portfolios, and ministerial responsibility for the Rugby World Cup. He retained his roles as Associate Minister of Justice and Finance. Cosgrove lost his ministerial position when Labour was defeated in the 2008 election.

Cosgrove was selected to attend the World Economic Forum's Annual meeting in New York and Davos in 2001 and 2002, and was appointed to the Forum's task force on Free Trade. He is generally considered to be on the right of the Labour Party.

Boy racers
In August 2007 Cosgrove was targeted after raising considerable concerns about boy racers, who have caused numerous and significant problems throughout his electorate and Christchurch in general. Boy racers attempted to intimidate Cosgrove in a number of ways, including defacing billboards and driving past his house on Saturday nights. New Zealand has considerable problems with boy racers, leading to many car seizures and a new law being mooted to crush the vehicles of the worst offenders.

Opposition (2008–2017)
When Lianne Dalziel confirmed that she would contest the 2013 Christchurch mayoralty, her Christchurch Earthquake Recovery portfolio was split and assigned to Cosgrove and Ruth Dyson in July 2013. He considered standing in the by-election resulting from Dalziel's resignation from Parliament, but in the end decided not to put his name forward for the Labour nomination.

He announced he would be retiring from politics at the 2017 general election in April 2016.

Post politics
After leaving parliament, Cosgrove worked as consultant and lobbyist, including for the ill-fated attempt to mine Foulden Maar for pig food and the Greymouth Hospital construction.

References

External links

Clayton Cosgrove – personal website
Clayton Cosgrove  at the Labour Party

|-

1969 births
Living people
New Zealand people of Irish descent
New Zealand Labour Party MPs
Members of the Cabinet of New Zealand
University of Canterbury alumni
Members of the New Zealand House of Representatives
New Zealand MPs for Christchurch electorates
People associated with the 2011 Christchurch earthquake
New Zealand list MPs
21st-century New Zealand politicians